Furnas is a surname. Notable people with the surname include:

Charles Furnas (1880-1941), first airplane passenger
Clifford C. Furnas (1900–1969), author, Olympic athlete, scientist, expert on guided missiles, university president, and public servant
Doug Furnas (1959-2012), American wrestler and powerlifter
George Furnas, professor and Associate Dean for Academic Strategy at the School of Information of the University of Michigan
J. C. Furnas (1906–2001), American writer and historian
Robert Wilkinson Furnas (1824-1905), second governor of Nebraska, USA